The 2022 Tunbridge Wells Borough Council election took place on 5 May 2022 to elect one third of Tunbridge Wells Borough Council in England.

Results summary

Ward results

Benenden & Cranbrook

Brenchley & Horsmonden

Broadwater

Culverden

Hawkhurst & Sandhurst

Paddock Wood East

Paddock Wood West

Pantiles & St. Mark's

Park

Pembury

Sherwood

Southborough & High Brooms

Southborough North

Speldhurst & Bidborough

St. James'

St. John's

References

Tunbridge
Tunbridge Wells Borough Council elections